The Committees on Arms Export Controls (formerly the Quadripartite Committee) is the name for the concurrent meeting of four House of Commons select committees, comprising the International Trade Select Committee, the Defence Select Committee, the Foreign Affairs Select Committee, and the International Development Select Committee.

The remit of the committee is to examine the Government's expenditure, administration and policy on strategic exports (licensing of arms exports and other controlled goods).

In 2015 to 2016 the committee did not meet for over 9 months after the chairman Sir John Stanley retired as an MP, because of a long delay in appointing new members.  Chris White was elected chair in February 2016. In March 2016 an inquiry into the use of UK-manufactured weapons in Yemen was launched.

Membership
As of the 19 June 2022, the members of the Committees are:

See also
List of Committees of the United Kingdom Parliament

References

External links
Committees on Arms Export Controls
Records for this Committee are held at the Parliamentary Archives
Committee on Twitter

Committees of the British House of Commons
Arms control